David Ker (February 1758 – January 21, 1805), born in northern Ireland, was a minister, educator, lawyer and judge, the first presiding professor (equivalent of a modern-day university president) of the University of North Carolina.

Early life
David Ker was born in February 1758 in Downpatrick, Ireland. He was of Scottish ancestry. 
He graduated from Trinity College in Dublin.

Ker became a Presbyterian minister with the Temple Patrick Presbytery. and married Mary. Ker emigrated with his family to the United States in the 1780s and was recorded in Orange County, North Carolina, by 1789, when their son was born there.

Career
In 1791, Ker served as a Presbyterian minister in Fayetteville, North Carolina. He was a schoolteacher on weekdays and gave sermons in the courthouse on Sundays.

Ker moved to Chapel Hill, North Carolina, in 1794, where he served as the first presiding professor (now known as university president) of the University of North Carolina at Chapel Hill. He resigned two years later, in 1796, after arguing with the trustees and students. Indeed, the trustees had tried to demote him to Professor of Languages, but he refused. After it became evident that they wouldn't budge, he decided to leave.

Ker moved to Lumberton, North Carolina. He served as the first president of an academy founded by John Willis, a Brigadier General in the American Revolutionary War who owned a large plantation in Lumberton, in the 1790s. Meanwhile, he passed the Bar exam.

Ker moved to Natchez, Mississippi, with John Willis in 1800. He established the first public school for women in the Mississippi Territory. His wife and daughters taught at the school. Shortly after, he became the Sheriff and Clerk of the Court of Adams County, Mississippi. Two years later, in 1802, he was made a judge of the Mississippi Supreme Court by President Thomas Jefferson, replacing Judge Daniel Tilton.

Personal life
Ker married a woman named Mary. They had five children: 
David Ker. He died unmarried at the age of twenty-three.
John Ker. He married Mary Baker, the daughter of Joshua Baker, the 22nd Governor of Louisiana, and became a surgeon, planter and politician.
Sarah Ker. She married Mr Cowden.
Eliza Ker. She married Rush Nutt who owned Laurel Hill Plantation.
Martha Ker. She married William Terry.

Death and legacy
Ker died on January 21, 1805, in Natchez, Mississippi. His widow burned all his papers after his death, fearing they might inappropriately influence others. Ker's portrait is preserved at the Southern Historical Collection of the University of North Carolina at Chapel Hill.

References

1758 births
1805 deaths
American people of Scottish descent
Irish emigrants to the United States (before 1923)
People from Downpatrick
Politicians from Fayetteville, North Carolina
People from Chapel Hill, North Carolina
People from Natchez, Mississippi
Alumni of Trinity College Dublin
American Presbyterian ministers
Leaders of the University of North Carolina at Chapel Hill
Mississippi Territory judges
18th-century American clergy